The Cross of Valour was established in 1975 as the highest Australian Bravery Award. The awards were established as part of the institution of the Australian Honours System. The Cross of Valour has been awarded to five Australian civilians and, although there has been no Australian military recipient, they would be eligible in situations where normal honours to the military do not apply.

The Cross of Valour is awarded "only for acts of the most conspicuous courage in circumstances of extreme peril". The award carries the post-nominal initials CV; awards may be made posthumously.

Description
 The Cross of Valour is a gold, straight-armed cross pattée with diminishing rays between the arms. It is ensigned with the Crown of St Edward.
 The obverse has the shield and crest of the Commonwealth Coat of Arms surmounted by a Federation Star. A suspender bar is engraved with the words 'For Valour'.
 The ribbon is 38 mm wide, magenta with a central 16 mm blood-red band. The two reds in the ribbon represent the colours of venous and arterial blood.

List of recipients
To date, the Cross of Valour has been awarded to five recipients.

1989
 Mr Darrell Tree, Captain of Mount Damper Fire Brigade, SA – Rescued a 3-year-old child from electrocution.

1995
 Mr Victor Boscoe, Qld – Pursued and apprehended armed robbers at Strathpine.

1998
 Senior Constable Allan Sparkes, NSW – Rescued a boy from flooded underground storm water drains.

2003
 Senior Constable Timothy Britten, WA – Entered the bombed Bali nightclub to rescue a badly injured woman, and then continued to search for survivors despite personal injury and ongoing explosions.

 Mr Richard Joyes, WA – Entered the bombed Bali nightclub to rescue a badly injured woman, and then continued to search for survivors despite personal injury and ongoing explosions.

Decoration allowance
The Australian Department of Veterans' Affairs may grant an allowance, called decoration allowance, to a veteran who has been awarded the Cross of Valour if the veteran is in receipt of a pension under Part II of the Veterans' Entitlements Act 1986 (VE Act) and the award was for gallantry during a war to which the VE Act applies or during warlike operations. So far there have been no awards of the Cross of Valour during wars or warlike operations as required by the VE Act. The allowance has been A$2.10 per fortnight since the Goods and Services Tax in Australia commenced on 1 July 2000.

See also
 Orders, decorations, and medals of Australia
 British and Commonwealth orders and decorations
 Cross of Valour – Canada's counterpart
 George Cross – United Kingdom's counterpart
 New Zealand Cross – New Zealand's counterpart

References

External links
 Cross of Valour Association of Australia – official website

Civil awards and decorations of Australia
Courage awards
1975 establishments in Australia
Awards established in 1975